The first Philadelphia Ukrainians team, also known as the "Philadelphia Tridents", Tryzub FC (Ukrainian Sports Association Philadelphia Tridents, in ), was an American soccer club based in Philadelphia, Pennsylvania and was a member of the American Soccer League. The Ukrainian Nationals were six (6) time American Soccer League Champions: in 1960-61, 1961–62, 1962–63, 1963–64, 1967–68 and 1970. The team's colors are red and black. The Philadelphia Ukrainian Nationals were the first team in United States history to have home games televised, and played in the first regulation indoor soccer game in Atlantic City's Convention Center in New Jersey.

Throughout its history the Philadelphia Ukrainian Nationals have hosted international friendly matches with teams such as Manchester United F.C., Austria Wien, VfB Stuttgart, Wolverhampton Wanderers F.C., Eintracht Frankfurt, Manchester City F.C., Dundee F.C. and Nottingham Forest F.C.

History

Philadelphia Ukrainians
The club was suspended by the USSFA one week into its first professional season, following a complaint by the Penn State Association.

Year-by-year

Ukrainian Nationals/Philadelphia Ukrainians
The Ukrainian Nationals was an American soccer club based in Philadelphia, Pennsylvania that was a member of the American Soccer League.

After the Philadelphia Ukrainians was suspended a week into the season, a new Philadelphia franchise, the Ukrainian Nationals, was awarded and took the former Philadelphia Ukrainians' spot in the league.

For the 1964/65 second season, the club joined the "super-league" Eastern Professional Soccer Conference. After the EPSC folded at the end of its only season, the team returned to the ASL.

The club became known as the Philadelphia Ukrainians before the 1968 season.

After the 1970 season, the team moved to the amateur German American Soccer League.

The club completed the "double" in 1961 and 1963, winning the league and the National Challenge Cup. The club also won the league cup (the Lewis Cup) in 1959 and were runners-up in 1958 and 1963.

Year-by-year

Honors 
American Soccer League Champion: 6
1960-61, 1961-62, 1962-63, 1963-64, 1967-68, 1970

National Challenge Cup Winner: 4
1959-60, 1960-61, 1962-63, 1965-66

CONCACAF Champions' Cup Quarterfinals: 1
1967

Philadelphia Soccer League Champion: 1
1955-56

References 
Notes

External links
 Футбол - Українська футбольна діаспора 
 History of the Philadelphia Ukrainian Nationals at their 60th anniversary - "America" news article
 Historical standings of the Cosmopolitan Soccer League (German-American Football Association)
 United Soccer League of Pennsylvania: Ukrainian Nationals Standings

 
Ukrainians
German-American Soccer League
American Soccer League (1933–1983) teams
Ukrainian association football clubs outside Ukraine
U.S. clubs in CONCACAF Champions' Cup
Ukrainian-American culture in Philadelphia
Association football clubs established in 1950
1950 establishments in Pennsylvania
Diaspora soccer clubs in the United States
U.S. Open Cup winners